Sadat Mahalleh (also Romanized as Sādāt Maḩalleh) is a village in Ahandan Rural District, in the Central District of Lahijan County, Gilan Province, Iran. At the 2006 census, its population was 862, in 225 families.

References 

Populated places in Lahijan County